Peter Boeve (born 14 March 1957) is a Dutch retired footballer who played for Ajax, Vitesse, Beerschot VAC and the Netherlands national team. He is the current coach of Hoofdklasse club CSV Apeldoorn.

During his career, while playing for Ajax, he was four times champion of Netherlands, three time Netherlands' Cup winner and a winner of European Cup Winners' Cup.

Playing career

Club
Marauding left back Boeve started his career at Vitesse and left them for Dutch giants Ajax in 1979. The Ajax defense had much to contend with in terms of injuries. The defender was especially quick and constructive and very strong offensively. This fitted well in the game system that Ajax played, where supporters could push the attack. Boeve would retain his place as an emerging left-wingback and played as many as 296 official matches for the club, 228 games of them in the league. On 10 February 1980 Boeve scored Ajax's 2000th league goal since the introduction of the Eredivisie in season 1956/1957 (although it is claimed by some sources that Charles Bonsink was). Boeve scored 0-2 in the match Ajax-Haarlem (1-3 final score). Ajax with Boeve were four times champion (1979/80, 1981/82, 1982/83 and 1984/1985), four times runners up (1980/81, 1985/86, 1986/87 and 1987/88) and once third (1983/84). At Ajax Boeve was five times a KNVB Cup finalist (1979/80, 1980/81, 1982/83, 1985/86 and 1986/87, the last three seasons emerging as the cup winners). Ajax reached the 1979/80 European Cup semi-final (goal difference +23 (31-8)), and in 1986/87, won the European Cup Winners' Cup. On 16 September 1987 Boeve got injured in a match against the Irish team Dundalk. In an unfortunate collision with an opponent he broke a rib and punctured a lung, but he played on. He would never return to the first team. After several matches in the second team, he decided to move to Belgian club Beerschot VAC. Boeve was considered one of the best left backs of his generation (in a constructive and offensive way).

International
Boeve made his debut for the Netherlands in a May 1982 friendly match against England and earned a total number of 16 caps for his country without scoring any goal. His final international was a May 1986 friendly match against West Germany.

Managerial career
After retiring as a footballer Boeve became active as a manager. Initially at amateur clubs Geinoord, DOVO and DVS '33, then he switched to professional football. As head coach, he joined RKC Waalwijk in 1997. After just over one year, he was discharged and went to work as an assistant to successful head coach Co Adriaanse at Willem II. He followed Adriaanse when the latter moved to Ajax, but Boeve rejected different jobs at the club after Adriaanse was dismissed. Boeve signed as coach of FC Zwolle in 2002. He was sacked by Zwolle in September 2003 after 'losing the dressing room' according to the club's directors. As of July 1, 2007 Boeve was again active in professional football as the new coach of FC Omniworld Almere after managing amateur sides HSC'21 and  Be Quick '28. Here he was discharged on January 28, 2009 due to disappointing results. As of the 2011/12 season he was assistant to head coach Darije Kalezic at the Belgian SV Zulte Waregem, only to leave the club in January 2012 after Kalezic was sacked a month earlier.  In September 2013 he became assistant at AS Trenčín.

Boeve is in charge of CSV Apeldoorn since the 2015/16 season.

Sidelines 
On 14 December 2010, Boeve was voted in Ajax' Members Council after Johan Cruijff and Keje Molenaar called for more former Ajax players in the committee.

Personal life
Boeve lives in Uddel and has been married to Hanneke Volkers since 1983. They have three sons. His father, Peter Boeve Sr., started the Alpuro company in 1963 and made a fortune in calve-breeding, making 462nd in the Dutch 500 Rich list in 2000.

Honours 
 Ajax
 KNVB Cup
 1983, 1986 and 1987
 European Cup Winners' Cup
 1987

References

External links

 Profile 

1957 births
Living people
People from Ermelo, Netherlands
Association football fullbacks
Dutch footballers
Netherlands international footballers
SBV Vitesse players
AFC Ajax players
K. Beerschot V.A.C. players
Eredivisie players
Eerste Divisie players
Belgian Pro League players
Dutch expatriate footballers
Expatriate footballers in Belgium
Dutch expatriate sportspeople in Belgium
Dutch football managers
RKC Waalwijk managers
AFC Ajax non-playing staff
PEC Zwolle managers
Almere City FC managers
VV DOVO managers
Willem II (football club) non-playing staff
Footballers from Gelderland